The Yellowstone class was a class of four destroyer tenders in service with the United States Navy from 1980 to 1996.

History
The Yellowstone class was a repetition of the preceding , so that sometimes all ships are put in one class. All ships were commissioned in 1980 to 1983 to replace the ageing . However, the end of the Cold War in 1990 led to the retirement of the Yellowstone class after only 13 to 16 years of service. After spending about another 15 years in the Reserve Fleet, three ships were scrapped and one was sunk as a target.

Ships

References

 
Ships built in San Diego
Auxiliary depot ship classes